France 3  is a French free-to-air public television channel and part of the France Télévisions group, which also includes France 2, France 4, France 5 and France Info.

It is made up of a network of regional television services providing daily news programming and around ten hours of entertainment and cultural programming produced for and about the regions each week. The channel also broadcasts various national programming and national and international news from Paris. The channel was known as France Régions 3 (FR3) until its official replacement by France 3 in September 1992.

Prior to the establishment of RFO, now Outre-Mer 1ère, it also broadcast to the various French overseas departments and territories.

History

La Troisième Chaîne Couleur (1972–1974)
On March 22, 1969, the government mentioned a plan to create a third national television channel. Jean-Louis Guillaud, attached to the Office of the President of the Republic, coordinated the preparatory studies for its launch from November 1969. This new national channel of the French Television Broadcasting Office (ORTF) was to be launched directly in color and to allow better exposure of the regional offices of the ORTF through many opt-outs and through the decentralized production of the channel's programmes. The ORTF implemented this project throughout 1972 in the form of a national and interregional channel in color, without advertising or continuity announcers (although out-of-vision announcers were later introduced), offering shorter evenings at different times compared to the other two channels, with a majority of cultural programs, and relying largely on the technical and editorial relays of its regional stations. To accomplish this, the Board is setting up several heavy production centers within its main regional stations to produce programming for the new channel. The most important are those of Télé Marseille-Provence, Télé-Lille and Télé-Lyon. The third channel thus responds to the main concern of reform law no. 72-5534 of 3 July 1972 on the status of the ORTF, which aims to introduce the decentralization of production and the devolution of decisions on programs the Office.

The third color channel (La Troisième Chaîne Couleur) of the ORTF started its operations on December 31, 1972, at 7 pm with its start-up theme, which was gollowed by the CEO of the ORTF, Arthur Conte, and the general manager of the channel, Jean-Louis Guillaud, who present their wishes to the French for this new channel and for the year to come, calling on the ORTF's regional television services and aspiring young staff to join the new network, and then followed by Jean Amadou welcoming the viewers to briefly explain to them what will distinguish this new channel from the two others, in particular in its colorful, dynamic design and the introduction of genre credits before each programme, in order to replace the announcers, and which are all the work of stylist Catherine Chaillet. Then, the first program, Jeunes années, a program for young people, was launched with the cartoon Roulotte, followed at 8:35 p.m. by the inaugural evening of the channel consisting of a variety show written by Maurice Horgues, Jean Amadou and Robert Rocca, directed by Dirk Sanders and produced by the Lille8 production center and whose national sponsor is the singer Anne-Marie David, chosen by the CEO of the Office.

The director general of the third color channel, Jean-Louis Guillaud, decides to make extensive use of the regional stations of the ORTF and young directors for the production of the programs, because the third channel intends to prove itself as a new channel regions and cinema, using state-of-the-art techniques and high-quality graphics. The original project, which planned to rely on the cultural and artistic actors of the regions within the framework of the long-awaited decentralization within the Office, in fact comes down to a simple deconcentration of resources of production, regional television remaining confined to the little space granted in the opt-outs of the national service.

For the first time, the candidates of the second round of the presidential election of 1974, Valéry Giscard d'Estaing and François Mitterrand, agree to confront each other verbally in a televised debate, arbitrated by Jacqueline Baudrier and Alain Duhamel and broadcast on May 10, 1974, simultaneously on the three ORTF television channels.

Audiovisual reform law no. 74-696 of August 7, 197410 suppressed the ORTF and created seven independent bodies, including three national television program companies. It came into effect on January 1, 1975, and the third ORTF channel closed its antenna on January 5, 1975, at 9:40 p.m. to make way the next day for the new national program company France Regions 3 (FR3).

For lack of a complete network on this date of January 5, 1975, a good part of France has have known the programs of the ORTF's third channel. Throughout its run, broadcasts were restricted to three hours each evening and only reached a potential audience of 26% of the population – its transmissions primarily covered Paris, the Ile-de-France and Northern regions.

Autonomous from the state (1974–1999)
In 1974, the new President of the Republic Valéry Giscard d'Estaing asked his Prime Minister to present a communication on the French Television Broadcasting Office to the Council of Ministers on July 3. Jacques Chirac then assures that “the new organization must be based on competition between autonomous units, fully responsible. It must ensure free and open information, must exclude any waste by relying on streamlined structures. The reports of the State and of the new autonomous units should be limited to the designation of its leaders”. Law No. 74-696 of August 7, 1974 abolished the ORTF and created seven independent bodies, including three national television program companies, a national sound broadcasting company, two public industrial and commercial companies responsible for the production and broadcasting and a national audiovisual institute. The state monopoly is maintained and each of the companies is placed under the supervision of the Prime Minister. The Office's television director, Claude Contamine, was appointed by the Council of Ministers as president of the future national television program company to succeed the ORTF's third channel. The choice of a manager from the seraglio responds to the already well-defined face of the future third channel in the law of August 7, article 10 of which specifies that "one of the national companies reserves a privileged place for the programming of films on television”. This point is also clearly written into the specifications of the national program company France Régions 3, which makes it not only the channel aimed at the regions, but above all the channel of cinema and fiction in the broad sense, FR3 in front should devote more than half of its evenings to the airing of films and TV films. This new national television program company is also responsible for managing and developing the regional radio and television centers created by the Office (22 regional stations and 29 radio centers governed by 11 metropolitan directorates and a DOM-TOM directorate managing 9 stations in French overseas territories). We then count on the productions of the 22 regional stations, then equivalent to 35 minutes of regional television per day.

Law no. 74-696 of August 7, 1974 came into force on January 1, 1975, with the official birth of the three national television program companies Télévision française 1 (TF1), Antenne 2 (A2) and France Régions 3 (FR3), the national sound broadcasting company Radio France, the French Production Company (SFP), Télédiffusion de France (TDF) and the National Audiovisual Institute (INA).

On Monday January 6, 1975 at 6:55 pm, France Régions 3 begins its operations with a program schedule similar in all respects to that of the former third channel. The channel broadcasts only four hours of programs a day and devotes only five minutes to its inaugural broadcast this evening of January 6 to make way for the film Peau d'âne by Jacques Demy.

TDF activates the FR3 transmitters at 2 pm, a paradox because the channel then broadcasts both the target and its own programs. Until the arrival of a 24-hour broadcast, TDF will broadcast FIP ​​as background music from 1975 to 2000 on network 3, then France Info until 2002.

FR3 programs are mainly devoted to cinema, debates and regional stalls. The cinema channel, FR3 participates as a co-producer and for a sum of 5,450,000 francs in the development of the seventh art. Following complaints from movie theater owners, who are concerned about unfair competition, Claude Contamine negotiates with the Film Industry Liaison Office (BLIC) to remove the movies from Friday, Saturday and Sunday evenings, as well as twelve film showings on Wednesday evenings while in return creating a film club slot on Sunday evenings in the second half of the evening. The agreement was finalized on January 16, 1976, and Cinéma de minuit was on the air two months later.

On September 1, 1975, an agreement was signed between the two national program companies FR3 and TF1 to allow the latter, which inherited the first black and white VHF network in 819 lines, to be able to broadcast its programs in color. FR3 agrees to make available the color broadcasting network to TF1 reserved for it for regular transmissions in the afternoon until the start of its own programs at 6 p.m. In return, the agreement provides for TF1 to employ the regional production centers for FR33. The overseas station FR3-Comores became FR3 Mayotte on December 14, 1975, following the declaration of independence of the Federal Islamic Republic of the Comoros. With the gradual appearance of more specifically regional television content in 1976, the State very slowly undertook the administrative and economic regionalization of French territory, where regional stations gradually entered into this new framework.

FR3 must separate from its overseas broadcasting station of the French Territory of the Afars and Issas on June 27, 1977, following the declaration of independence of the Republic of Djibouti, although its still appeared highlighted in the channel's start-up sequence.

On the programming front, the network's first national news programme was introduced in 1978 in the form of Soir 3, a late night national and international bulletin. 21 October 1981 saw FR3 begin regular live coverage of ministers' questions in the National Assembly. Advertising was introduced to the network in January 1983. By September 1983, the twelve broadcasting centres around the country were airing an average of 3 hours per day of regional output. Popular programming on Saturday night included the first airings of the American soap opera Dynasty and a Disney Channel strand. National and regional news at peak time was integrated into a new nightly programme, 19|20, launched on 6 May 1986.

On May 5, 1981, the debate between Valéry Giscard d'Estaing and François Mitterrand for the second round of the presidential election, arbitrated by Jean Boissonnat and Michèle Cotta was broadcast simultaneously on TF1, Antenne 2 and FR3.

Although it had long denounced the grip of power on television, the left, which came to power on May 10, 1981, in turn used this habit of interventionism to appoint new presidents to head the national television program companies more won over to his ideas and who are themselves responsible for cleaning up their channel of broadcasts, journalists and presenters suspected of acquaintances with the former majority. Thus, journalist Guy Thomas was appointed president of FR3 on June 24, 1981. He appointed Serge Moati to program management with the idea of strengthening the cultural and regional character of the channel.

Law no. 82-652 of July 29, 1982 on audiovisual communication suppresses the State monopoly and recreates by decree no. 82-790 of September 17, 19824 the national color television company France Regions 3 which is now the High Authority for Audiovisual Communication, which draws up the specifications, monitors competition rules and appoints the channel's president. Guy Thomas is not confirmed in his post by the new supervisory authority which appoints André Holleaux in his place. Alongside the administrative decentralization law, the 1982 law provides for a large decentralization of radio and television. To do this, FR3 ceases to be the operator of the 29 regional radio centers which are transferred to Radio-France and also loses its overseas audiovisual activities in FR3 DOM-TOM to the benefit of the new national program company RFO which had to be created for this purpose.

Similarly, the text of the law provides for the creation of twelve regional television companies, with the same programming and management powers as the national company, with their own board of directors whose president would be appointed by the High Authority. The law also provides for an increase in the share of regional programs on the air, which must go from thirty-five minutes to one hour per day5, which requires an increase in the FR3 budget of approximately 220 million francs which, according to the direction of the chain, could be covered by the opening of the antenna to the publicity of mark whose income is estimated at 250 million francs. On January 1, 1983, the High Authority for Audiovisual Communication authorized brand advertising on the national FR3 network up to 250 million francs per year (i.e. 10% of the combined revenue of TF1 and Antenne 2), although the plan of decentralization in 1982 is slowed down by the authorities, in particular because of the poor results for the majority in the municipal elections of 1983. staff of the three public channels, which the license fee alone is no longer sufficient to finance. Regionalization is at the heart of the specifications set by the High Authority for the channel in 1984. It thus limits the number of film broadcasts per year to 170, identical to TF1 and Antenne 2, which means that FR3 its specificity as a cinema channel in favor of the future new private channel Canal+, leaving it only its regional specificity, and authorizes brand advertising on the regional antennas of FR3.

Plans to privatisation (1986–1989)
On May 6, 1986, FR3 changed its look and changed its program schedule by starting at 9 am, instead of 5pm as it was until then, and by putting on the air a new local information program, with national and international headlines, named 19/20 created and presented by Henri Sannier with Ghislaine Ottenheimer. The in-vision announcers also made their appearance the same year.

In 1986, the then government of Jacques Chirac put forward the proposal of privatising one of the three public television companies. The original suggestion was to transform FR3 into a private body, however the final decision was that of TF1. The broadcasting authority at the time, the CNCL, appointed Rene Han to become programme controller of FR3, with the result that the networked programmes took an even more highbrow and cultural focus.

Changes to the schedule included a supplementary Friday night edition of  Thalassa- le magazine de la mer whilst an opera was televised every Wednesday night. Popular quiz show Questions pour un champion made its broadcasting début in November 1988. La Classe, an entertainment programme which replaced Les Jeux de 20 heures and followed 19|20, was also introduced. Having launched without utilising speakerines, the network introduced in-vision announcers in September 1987 and retained live continuity until 1993, a year after TF1 and France 2 had abandoned in-vision presentation.

Reaffirmation of the public sector (1989–1990)
At the turn of the decade, the French television landscape which had been previously dominated by the three public stations now consisted of a strong private sector in the form of TF1 and Canal+ and the now-fragmented public sector of Antenne 2 and FR3. In 1990, the State, through the Conseil Supérieure de l'Audiovisuel (CSA), decided to merge the separate public entities into a new corporation.

At the same time, FR3 was already closing down on Saturday afternoons to allow nine hours of airtime to the educational station La Sept, airing from 3pm to midnight. The arrangement continued until 1992 when the launch of the Franco-German network Arte led to the broadcaster's demise. On FR3 itself, the network aired current affairs programming on Saturday mornings including Continentales and L'Eurojournal, both presented by Alex Taylor.

The public reunification (1990–2009)
On 7 September 1992, FR3 and Antenne 2 were reunified in the new France Télévisions entity and rebranded as France 3 and France 2 respectively. Their logos match to the French flag like TF1. In 1998, France 3 partnered with TPS to launch a satellite station called Régions.

Between 2000 and 2005, La Cinquième (now France 5), RFO (along with RFOsat, now France Ô) and France 4 joined France 2 and France 3 under the France Télévisions corporate identity.

Under the direction of France Télévisions chairman Patrick de Carolis and director of channels Patrice Duhamel, October 2006 saw the introduction of a new daily cultural programme called Ce soir (ou jamais!) presented by Frederic Taddei, marking a new, more cultural focus to the network's programming. The late night news programme Soir 3 was given a new, fixed timeslot of 11 pm.

At present (2009–present)
On 5 January 2009 all on-air advertising on France Télévisions, (including France 3) between 20:00 and 06:00 was eliminated, meaning the traditional start of primetime viewing in France of 20:45 was brought forward by ten minutes to 20:35.

With the establishment of digital terrestrial television, France 3 has seen its national audience share down to under 10%, behind M6.

Branding

Idents

1992-2002 
On 7 September 1992, the new France 3 channel was given a logo designed by the Gédéon agency: the number "3" in blue with the word "France" inscribed in the upper part of the number. The jingles and trailers divide the screen into three equal horizontal bands, the upper two of which display the natural landscapes of France. This dressing remained on the air for eight years, the landscapes evolving over the seasons and the years. Only the trailers changed in 1998 to show animals and plants in extreme close-up. In 2000, the dressing develops smoothly: the three horizontal bands are no longer the same size (the one in the middle is smaller) and the landscapes are no longer only natural, but also urban.

2002-2018 
On 7 January 2002, the France Télévisions group adopted a new visual identity designated by the Gédéon agency. France 3 has a new logo similar to the other channels: a blue trapezium with the number "3" written in white inside along the right side. However, the logo has a particularity: the number "3" is not written with the new font of the group but keeps that of the old logo. In the early of September 2003, the channel changed its look. Jingle pubs feature animals drawn in white pencil coming to life in natural landscapes. These evolve with the seasons and in the spring of 2006, the animals are replaced by plants.

On 7 April 2008, the logo of France 3 changed with the addition of a 3D effect. While the 3D logo appears on air, the old 2D formula is still used for the channel's print publications. On 5 January 2009, France 3 got a new look designed by the Dream On agency. The advertising idents and jingles depict characters carrying out actions of daily life. To create a visual difference, they are placed in contemplative natural landscapes. On 5 September 2011, France 3 adopted a new look from the Gédéon agency. The screen is divided into 24 boxes representing the 24 regional newsrooms of the channel. Each box contains a different video extract, which juxtaposed form a single image representing a person in an action of daily life. This design is inspired by Dadaism and the work of photographer David Hockney.

France 3 regularly sets up temporary covers for events or special periods. Each summer, the channel offers a specific look. In 2013, the jingles feature wild animals with human behavior animated in 3D in photo-realistic settings. In 2014 and then 2015, new animals are staged. These idents have a certain public success (in particular the famous marmots, regularly acclaimed) and have been rewarded several times by professionals in the sector. From 31 December 2012, to 13 January 2013, and from 29 June to 11 August 2013, France 3 broadcasts jingles designed by the Demoiselles agency to mark its 40th anniversary. A logo is also created from the old logo of France Régions 3. On 4 January 2016, France 3 put its logo back in 2D. The 3D logo is still a small used.

2018-present 
On 8 December 2017, France Télévisions unveiled the new logos of its channels, which have been on the air since 29 January 2018.

On 29 January 2018, during a replay of the game (Le Grand Slam), a trailer and the new logo appeared at the end. This new logo is born during a coming next for the Ludo program block. Jingles pubs (Winter version) will appear from regional and local broadcasts such as 9:50 in the morning and Ludo, meanwhile, has new credits, a new look, and a new logo.

Logos

Mission
France 3 is a general entertainment channel whose mission is to deliver domestic and regional programming, offering cultural and educational advantages. Its local and regional vocation has been assured by its new mission statement. (" Elle doit privileger l'information décentralisée et les événements régionaux ")Translated it reads:

'It must promote local news and regional events and to introduce and familiarise the different regions of France and Europe and "to give space to our lively spectacles".'

Headquarters
France 3 was originally based at 13–15 rue Cognacq-Jay in Paris, which housed the television services of the former Office de Radiodiffusion Télévision Française (ORTF).

Since TF1 became independent from the ORTF, FR3 was based at the Maison de la Radio in the 16th arrondissement of Paris with its editorial base located at 28 Cours Albert 1er in the 8th arrondissement.

In 1998, France 3 moved to a new base at 7 Esplanade Henri de France in the 15th arrondissement. This also houses the rest of France Télévisions' operations. The headquarters are accessible by taking RER Line C to Boulevard Victor.

Programming

France 3 has fewer audience constraints compared with sister channel France 2, with the latter being the flagship public channel. This allows France 3 to concentrate on specialist and cultural programming.

It's offers three information sessions per day until 25 August 2019, and offers since 26 August 2019, and the stop of Soir 3 (replaced by the 11 p.m. of France Info) two information sessions per day, which include regional and local news editions. It also offers several weather reports per day.

Every morning, France 3 airs the children's programming block Okoo. While France 5 broadcasts pre-school programmes, France 3 targets the older age range. (Okoo airs every day on France 4.)

On 2 September 2020 France Ô ceased to be broadcast, since 31 August 2020 in order to replace certain missions of the channel, France 3 broadcasts two programs on the overseas territories every morning (Outre-mer le mag, Outre mer l'info).

Newscasts (Journal télévisé)
There are three weekday newscasts broadcast as part of the channel's schedule:

Current

12/13 
 is broadcast every day between 11:45 and 13:00 CET, presented by Émilie Tran Nguyen on weekdays and Catherine Matausch at weekends.

A typical edition of 12/13 consists of national news headlines at 11:45 followed by an Outre-Mer bulletin from the studios of RFO Paris at 11:50. The regional opt-out bulletins (midi-pile) air at noon, followed by the national news from 12:25–12:55 CET.

19/20
 France 3's flagship evening news programming block, 19/20, airs nightly between 18:40 and 20:00 CET. The nationwide sections of 19|20 are presented by Carole Gaessler from Monday to Thursday and Catherine Matausch from Friday to Sunday.

A typical edition of 19/20 opens with a short summary of the national and regional headlines. This is then followed by an opt-out for either regional news or local features, with the main regional news airing after this at 19:00. The national news concludes the programming block at 19:30.

Previously, a 15-minute programme, launched in July 2010 called 18:30 Aujourd'hui opened the 19/20 news sequence, presenting the leading news stories from France 3's regional news bureaux. It was cancelled in September 2011, with the regional round-up moving to the 12/13 news programme.

Former

Soir/3 
Soir 3, broadcast every night at 22:30 CET, is the network's late night news programme, presented by Francis Letellier (ad interim) on weeknights and Sandrine Aramon at weekends.

On 5 January 2009, the programme began to incorporate a 5-minute regional news opt-out as part of a revamp of France 3's schedule to accommodate the end of prime-time advertising.

The concept of the program remains "grand JT du soir de France Télévisions".

Entertainment
One of France 3's most well-known programmes is Plus belle la vie, a recurring soap opera based in the fictional neighbourhood of Mistral, Marseille. The show has garnered critical acclaim within France and commands one of the highest viewing figures for the channel.

Quiz shows make up an important part of the channel's schedule. Word and numbers game Des chiffres et des lettres and general knowledge show Questions pour un Champion both make regular appearances in the daytime.

Other well-known programmes are personality talk show Vie privée, vie publique, (Private life, public life), Thalassa, a programme about all things concerning the sea, magazine show Des racines et des ailes and children's science show C'est pas sorcier. Cookery and home-improvement shows also feature, with Côté Cuisine, Côté Jardin and A Table!. Live music shows also feature weekly. Taratata focuses on rock music, whilst Chabada rediscovers forgotten French pop songs. A selection of these programmes are also broadcast internationally, via TV5Monde.

Until 1 April 2002, one of the first children's programs produced entirely in computer-generated images, and the show presented by Theo and Luna, two virtual characters.

Acquired programming
Amongst the acquired programmes screened by France 3, British dramas feature prominently. The popular detective dramas A Touch of Frost, Lewis, Inspector George Gently, and Midsomer Murders are shown and have different title names, such as Inspecteur Frost, Inspecteur Lewis, and Inspecteur Barnaby.

Information regarding climate change in weather forecasts 
In February 2023, 2 state TV channels, France 2 and France 3 have begun to enter information regarding climate change in their weather forecasts. This will make the forecasts 1.5-2 minutes longer. The climate related information will rely on experts. The channels will also provide information about climate change and the ways stopping it to their workers. In France, except in case of breaking news they will ask reporters to take the train instead of a plane.

Regional structure 

From its historical origins, the Third Channel has utilised regional editorial and production centres which were developed since 1963 and owned by the ORTF.

The regional centres are often grouped in two levels – two half-hour news programmes and a short late night bulletin are produced and broadcast each day (in many cases, separate bulletins are produced for various parts of the region). The centres also produce shorter, more localised news bulletins for broadcast within 19|20. For example, France 3 Nord Pas-de-Calais Picardie produces localised bulletins for Côte d'Opale, Lille Métropole and Picardy. Various sport, features, current affairs and entertainment programming produced for and about the regions are also broadcast.

13 regional stations make up the network. Between them, the stations provide 24 sub-regional services, whose broadcast areas approximately match the 22 former metropolitan régions of France (the exceptions being that Provence-Alpes-Côte d'Azur and Rhône-Alpes are sub-divided into two). Each sub-regional news service emanates from a distinct centre of production. In addition, the stations provide 42 more localised news opt-outs.

Some news reports sourced from France 3 Ouest were aired by Channel Television for the now-defunct weekly news programme Rendezvous Dimanche. In Belgium, local programming from France 3 Nord Pas-de-Calais Picardie has been known to receive twice the number of viewers than in its intended coverage area.

19|20 local opt-outs
Within the main 19|20 programming block and depending on where the viewer receives France 3 via terrestrial transmitters, local opt-out bulletins (some live, some pre-recorded) concentrating on specific  are aired. The ten-minute opts air at around 1845 CET before the main regional news.

Notes
 France 3 Alsace also airs a daily bulletin in the Alsatian language as part of the 12|13 lunchtime news block.
 France 3 Bourgogne Franche-Comté airs a daily pan-regional magazine show, instead of local news bulletins.
 The  regional opt-out on France 3 Corse is in the Corsican language.
 France 3 Picardie airs a daily pan-regional discussion show, instead of local news bulletins.
 France 3 Bretagne also airs a daily bulletin in the Breton language in the Iroise area as part of the 12|13 lunchtime news block.
 France 3 Paris Île-de-France airs additional pan-regional news coverage during this timeslot.
 France 3 Languedoc-Roussillon also airs bulletins in the Occitan language and Catalan language as part of 19|20 on Saturdays.

Regional languages 
France 3 also produces and airs programmes regionally for the various regional languages of France. Outside of regional news bulletins, France 3 also airs general interest programmes in the target language.

Occitan 
Regional programming in the Occitan language started sporadically, with 15 minutes daily of news reports. After audience protests, by 1982 the time devoted to the language rose to over 3 hours weekly.
Viure al Pais (Living in the Country) – Magazine show in Catalan or Occitan aired on France 3 Sud.
Punt de vista (Point of View) – France 3 Aquitaine, France 3 Languedoc-Roussillon
Vaqui – Magazine programme broadcast on France 3 Provence-Alpes

Basque

Breton 
Programmes in the Breton language started with a daily news bulletin from predecessor RTF Télé-Bretagne.
Red an Amzer – weekly current affairs programme, broadcast on Sundays
Te ha Me (From You to Me) – Interview programme, broadcast on Saturday mornings
Mouchig-Dall – Children's programme, broadcast on Wednesdays
Son da zont (Song Coming Up) – Saturday morning music programme, showcasing music in Breton.
Istorioù Breizh

Corsican 
Despite having special status as a semi-autonomous region, only 40 minutes per week are devoted to the Corsican language. The first programme in Corsican was in 1966 and was a weekly poetry reading from a Corsican-language school.

 Soir 3 Édition Corse – nightly news opt-out.

Alsatian 
Since the creation of its predecessor RTF Télé-Strasbourg, there have been sporadic programmes in the Alsatian language. By 1974 there was a weekly show of 45 minutes, in 1989 Rund Um, a magazine programme aired its first episode. After the merger of France 2 and France 3 into France Télévisions, France 3 Alsace has financed an Alsatian version of animated series Tintin.

 A Gueter – cookery show, airs Saturday mornings.
 Lade ùff – Regional arts and culture show, shown Saturday mornings.
 Gsuntheim – airs Sunday mornings.

Organization

Directors
Chairmen and chief executive officers:
Jean-Louis Guillaud: 31 December 1972 – 31 December 1974
Claude Contamine:  1 January 1975 – June 1981
Guy Thomas: June 1981 – 09/1982
André Holleaux: 09/1982 – 21 October 1985
Janine Langlois-Glandier: 21 October 1985 – 12/1986
René Han: 12/1986 – 10 Aug 1989
Philippe Guilhaume (joint chairmanship A2/FR3): 10 Aug 1989 – 19 December 1990
Hervé Bourges (joint chairmanship A2/FR3): 19 December 1990 – 7 Sep 1992

General managers:
 Philippe Levrier
 Rémy Pflimlin
 Geneviève Giard: since September 2005

Presenters/Hosts

References

External links

  

France 3
03
Television channels and stations established in 1972
French-language television stations
Television stations in France